Bijanbari is a village in Darjeeling Pulbazar CD block in the Darjeeling Sadar subdivision of the Darjeeling district in West Bengal, India. It is a place of importance in Darjeeling district mainly because of the Block Divisional Office and a Hydel Power Plant.

Geography

Location
Bijanbari is located at 

Bijanbari lies in a valley at an altitude of 760 m above sea level. The Little Rangeet River (Chota Rangeet) flows near this town. It came to limelight because of give away of bridge over Rangeet River on 22 Oct 2011. 33 People died and several injured.

Area overview
The map alongside shows the northern portion of the Darjeeling Himalayan hill region. In Darjeeling Sadar subdivision 61% of the total population lives in the rural areas and 39% of the population lives in the urban areas. There are 78 tea gardens/ estates (the figure varies slightly according to different sources), producing and largely exporting Darjeeling tea in the district. It engages a large proportion of the population directly/ indirectly. Some tea gardens were identified in the 2011 census as census towns or villages. Such places are marked in the map as CT (census town) or R (rural/ urban centre). Specific tea estate pages are marked TE.

Note: The map alongside presents some of the notable locations in the subdivision. All places marked in the map are linked in the larger full screen map.

Civic administration

Police station
Pulbazar police station is shown as being located in Bijanbari mouza in the map of Darjeeling Pulbazar CD block on page 121 of District Census Handbook, Darjeeling.

Pullbazar police station has jurisdiction over the Darjeeling Pulbazar CD block.

CD block HQ
The headquarters of the Darjeeling Pulbazar CD block is at Bijanbari.

Demographics
According to the 2011 Census of India, Bijanbari had a total population of 5,338 of which 2,685 (50%) were males and 2,653 (50%) were females. There were 514 persons in the age range of 0 to 6 years. The total number of literate people in Bijanbari was 4,156 (77.86% of the population over 6 years).

Agriculture
Agriculture is the main industry in Bijanbari and the surrounding areas. The valley produces potatoes, cardamom, rice, maize, millets, peas, beans, squash, cauliflower, cabbages, tomatoes and oranges.

Education
Bijanbari Degree College was established in 1995. Affiliated with the University of North Bengal, it offers honours courses in Nepali, English, political science and history and a general course in arts.

Bijanbari has three private schools and a government-run school up to the 12th standard.

Government School - Vidyasagar Higher Secondary School.
Private Schools - Little Rangit English School, Vidya Jyoti Academy and Saptarshi Academy.

Healthcare
Bijanbari Rural Hospital, with 30 beds, is the major government medical facility in the Darjeeling Pulbazar CD block.

References

Villages in Darjeeling district